Sanyuanqu railway station is a railway station in Sanyuan District, Sanming, Fujian, China.

History

Sanyuanqu railway station was previously called Sanming, however its name was changed on 15 July 2018 in preparation for the opening of the new Sanming railway station, which had previously been called Sanming South.

The final passenger service ran on 4 January 2019, after which all passenger trains on the Yingtan–Xiamen railway between Sanming North and Jiaomei were suspended.

References

Railway stations in Fujian